Om Prakash (born January 1940, in Delhi) is an Indian economic historian.  He is noted for his work on the Dutch East India company in Bengal, and also for his work on coinage, precious metal trade, and other aspects of pre-colonial commerce between Europe and India.  In 2005, he was knighted by the Dutch queen.

Early life and education 
He did his M.A. from the Delhi School of Economics in 1961, ranking first, and continued with his PhD in Economic History.  His thesis, The Dutch East India Company and the Economy of Bengal, 1630-1720, is based on archival material from the Nationaal Archief at the Hague.  It was published as a book by the Princeton University Press in 1985.

Career 
Subsequently, Prakash joined the Delhi School of Economics faculty from 1965 and 2005.  His work is highly regarded in the Netherlands, where he is a Foreign Member of the Royal Netherlands Academy of Arts and Sciences, Haarlem (since 2000). In April 2005, he was honoured as a "Knight in the Order of the Netherlands Lion"  by Queen Beatrix.

He is also the author of European commercial enterprise in pre-colonial India (1998), published under the New Cambridge History of India series (part II, v.5).

References

External links
 

1940 births
Delhi School of Economics alumni
Academic staff of Delhi University
20th-century Indian historians
20th-century Indian economists
Economic historians
Historians of India
Living people
Members of the Royal Netherlands Academy of Arts and Sciences
Historians of the Dutch East India Company